Saanich and the Islands was a provincial electoral district in the Canadian province of British Columbia from 1966 to 1986.  Most of the riding is now part of Saanich North and the Islands, while the southern part of the riding is now Saanich South.

For other current and historical ridings on Vancouver Island, please see Vancouver Island (electoral districts) or, for those in the area of Victoria, Victoria (electoral districts).

Electoral history
Note: Winners of each election are in bold.

|-

|Liberal
|James McGeer Campbell
|align="right"|3,401 	
|align="right"|23.52%
|align="right"|
|align="right"|unknown

|- bgcolor="white"
!align="right" colspan=3|Total valid votes
!align="right"|14,459 
!align="right"|100.00%
!align="right"|
|- bgcolor="white"
!align="right" colspan=3|Total rejected ballots
!align="right"|152
!align="right"|
!align="right"|
|- bgcolor="white"
!align="right" colspan=3|Turnout
!align="right"|%
!align="right"|
!align="right"|
|}

|-

|Liberal
|Louis Frederick Lindholm
|align="right"|3,312 	
|align="right"|16.41%
|align="right"|
|align="right"|unknown

|- bgcolor="white"
!align="right" colspan=3|Total valid votes
!align="right"|20,178
!align="right"|100.00%
!align="right"|
|- bgcolor="white"
!align="right" colspan=3|Total rejected ballots
!align="right"|136
!align="right"|
!align="right"|
|- bgcolor="white"
!align="right" colspan=3|Turnout
!align="right"|63.19%
!align="right"|
!align="right"|
|}

|-

|Liberal
|Malcolm B. Anderson
|align="right"|3,581 		
|align="right"|15.25%
|align="right"|
|align="right"|unknown

|Independent
|John Crawford McKenzie
|align="right"|49 	 	 	
|align="right"|0.21%
|align="right"|
|align="right"|unknown

|Progressive Conservative
|Hugh Austin Curtis
|align="right"|8,427
|align="right"|35.88%
|align="right"|
|align="right"|unknown

|- bgcolor="white"
!align="right" colspan=3|Total valid votes
!align="right"|23,487
!align="right"|100.00%
!align="right"|
|- bgcolor="white"
!align="right" colspan=3|Total rejected ballots
!align="right"|265
!align="right"|
!align="right"|
|- bgcolor="white"
!align="right" colspan=3|Turnout
!align="right"|%
!align="right"|
!align="right"|
|}
  	  	  	  	 

|-

|Progressive Conservative
|Irene Rose Block
|align="right"|2,883 	      
|align="right"|10.22% 
|align="right"|
|align="right"|unknown

|Liberal
|Edgar Rudolf Rhomberg
|align="right"|1,079 	
|align="right"|3.83%
|align="right"|
|align="right"|unknown
|- bgcolor="white"
!align="right" colspan=3|Total valid votes
!align="right"|28,195             
!align="right"|100.00%
!align="right"|
|- bgcolor="white"
!align="right" colspan=3|Total rejected ballots
!align="right"|356
!align="right"|
!align="right"|
|- bgcolor="white"
!align="right" colspan=3|Turnout
!align="right"|%
!align="right"|
!align="right"|
|}
  	  	  	  	 

|-

|Progressive Conservative
|John Willison Green
|align="right"|2,431 	      
|align="right"|7.50% 
|align="right"|
|align="right"|unknown

|- bgcolor="white"
!align="right" colspan=3|Total valid votes
!align="right"|32,410 	 	  	  	       
!align="right"|100.00%
!align="right"|
|- bgcolor="white"
!align="right" colspan=3|Total rejected ballots
!align="right"|419
!align="right"|
!align="right"|
|- bgcolor="white"
!align="right" colspan=3|Total Registered Voters
!align="right"|
!align="right"|
!align="right"|
|- bgcolor="white"
!align="right" colspan=3|Turnout
!align="right"|%
!align="right"|
!align="right"|
|}

|-

|Progressive Conservative
|John Willison Green
|align="right"|1,560 	      
|align="right"|3.91% 
|align="right"|
|align="right"|unknown

|- bgcolor="white"
!align="right" colspan=3|Total valid votes
!align="right"|39,934	
!align="right"|100.00%
!align="right"|
|- bgcolor="white"
!align="right" colspan=3|Total rejected ballots
!align="right"|364
!align="right"|
!align="right"|
|- bgcolor="white"
!align="right" colspan=3|Turnout
!align="right"|%
!align="right"|
!align="right"|
|}

|-

|Liberal
|Clive Tanner
|align="right"|5,884 	
|align="right"|7.24%
|align="right"|
|align="right"|unknown

|- bgcolor="white"
!align="right" colspan=3|Total valid votes
!align="right"| 81,276 	
!align="right"|100.00%
!align="right"|
|- bgcolor="white"
!align="right" colspan=3|Total rejected ballots
!align="right"|585
!align="right"|
!align="right"|
|- bgcolor="white"
!align="right" colspan=3|Turnout
!align="right"|%
!align="right"|
!align="right"|
|- bgcolor="white"
!align="right" colspan=7|1  Seat increased to two members from one.
|}

After the 1986 election the riding was redistributed due to population growth in Saanich.  The successor ridings are:

Saanich North and the Islands (2001–present)
Saanich South (2001—present)

Former provincial electoral districts of British Columbia on Vancouver Island